Nayanmoola Saddle dam (Malayalam: നായൻമൂല തടയണ) is an earthen dam constructed across Karamanthode at Thariyode village of Wayanad district in Kerala, India. It is a saddle dam of Banasura sagar reservoir built as a part of the Kuttiyadi Augmentation scheme.

All the dams, except Kuttiady saddle, are earth fill dams. The Kuttiyadi saddle dam is a concrete dam. The spillway is located adjacent to the main dam at the right bank of the original river course. The water spread area at FRL / MWL is 12.77 km2. The catchment area of Nayanmoola Dam is 61.44 km2.

Specifications
Latitude :11⁰40’13.92”N *Longitude:75⁰57’45.6”E
Panchayath:Thariode
Village : Thariode
District : Wayanad
River Basin : Kabani
River : Karamanthodu
Release from Dam to river : NA
Taluk through which release flows : NA
Year of completion : 2005
Name of Project : Kuttiady Augmentation Scheme
Purpose of Project : Diversion 

DAM FEATURES 
Type of Dam : Homogeneous rolled earth fill
Classification : Saddle  Dam
Maximum Water Level (MWL) : EL 775.60 m
Full Reservoir Level ( FRL) : EL 775.60 m
Storage at FRL : 209.25  Mm3
Height from deepest foundation : 3.5 m
Length : 24.0 m
Spillway : No spillway
Crest Level : NA
River Outlet : Nil
Installed capacity of the Project : 231.75 MW
Officers in charge & phone No.Executive Engineer, Dam Safety Division No. V, Thariode,  PIN- 673122     Phone – 9446008415Project Identification Code ( PIC) : Nil
Assistant Executive Engineer, Dam Safety Sub Division, Thariode  PIN- 673122      Phone- 9496004480
Nayamoola is a saddle dam of Banasurasagar reservoir

Reservoir

The Gross Storage of Kuttiyadi Augmentation (Banasura sagar) Reservoir is 209 Mm 3  and live storage 185 Mm3 . The water stored in the reservoir is diverted to the reservoir of Kuttiyadi Hydro Electric Project through an interconnecting tunnel. The sill level of diversion tunnel at inlet is 750.83 m. The size and shape of tunnel is varying. It is varying from 2.35 m dia. circular lined tunnel for a length of 890m &2.85 m D shaped unlined tunnel for a length of 3873 m. Maximum diversion is11.6 m3 /s. The diverted water is used for power generation from Kuttiyadi Power Station. FRL of the reservoir is 775.60 m. Top level of dam is 778.50 m. There are four radial gates, each of size 10.97 m x 9.20 m. Crest level of spillway is 767.00 m. Spillway capacity is 1664 m3 /s. One lower level outlet is provided in the spillway structure at750.75 m of size 1.10 m X 1.75 m to release irrigation requirement.

References 

Dams in Kerala
Dams completed in 2005